The Alessandri Altarpiece is a tempera on panel painting by Filippo Lippi, also known as Saint Lawrence Enthroned Between Saints Cosmas and Damian and Donors and Saint Lawrence Enthroned with Saints and Donors. It is now in the Metropolitan Museum of Art in New York.

The dating is uncertain - most art critics place it between the mid 1440s and the early 1450s, though some hypothesize it may have been a family gift to Ginevra degli Alessandri on her marriage to Giovanni di Cosimo de' Medici on 20 January 1453. The work is originally thought to have consisted of a single panel, later divided up and finally restored into its present form as a triptych by Federico Zeri in 1971 by repainting vast areas at the base of the panel and Lawrence's legs. Another kneeling figure is almost completely lost and other parts of the painted surface are damaged or lost.

History
It is thought to be the painting mentioned in Vasari's Lives of the Artists as being produced for the Alessandri family villa at Vincigliata near Florence. Around 1790 it was moved to the family's palazzo in Borgo Albizi in Florence. In 1912 it was sold to a London art dealer, who sold it on to another in New York, from which it passed to its present owner in 1935.

References

1440s paintings
1450s paintings
Paintings by Filippo Lippi
Paintings in the collection of the Metropolitan Museum of Art
Paintings of Saint Lawrence
Paintings of Saints Cosmas and Damian
Altarpieces